Rustai-ye Chah-e Malek (also Romanized as Rūstāī-ye Chāh-e Malek; also known as Shahrak-e Chāhmalek) is a village in Rigan Rural District, in the Central District of Rigan County, Kerman Province, Iran. At the 2006 census, its population was 456, in 90 families.

References 

Populated places in Rigan County